Tunçbilek power station (also known as Çelikler Tunçbilek power station) is a 365 MW coal-fired power station in Turkey in Kütahya built in the 1970s, which burns lignite mined locally.
The plant is owned by Çelikler Holding and in 2018 received 41 million lira capacity payments. The area is a sulfur dioxide air pollution hotspot. According to İklim Değişikliği Politika ve Araştırma Derneği (Climate Change Policy and Research Association) in 2021 the plant operated without a licence for 11 days without penalty. It is estimated that closing the plant by 2030, instead of when its licence ends in 2064, would prevent over 6000 premature deaths.

References

External links 

 Tunçbilek power station on Global Energy Monitor

Coal-fired power stations in Turkey